The 1947 Furman Purple Hurricane football team was an American football team that represented Furman University as a member of the Southern Conference (SoCon) during the 1947 college football season. In its second and final season under head coach Bob Smith, the team compiled an overall record 2–7 with a mark of 1–4 against conference opponents, tied for 13th place in the SoCon, and was outscored by a total of 205 to 68. The team played its home games at Sirrine Stadium in Greenville, South Carolina.

Schedule

References

Furman
Furman Paladins football seasons
Furman Purple Hurricane football